Abdolhamid Fathi (born 10 April 1948), also known as Abdul Hamid Fathi, is an Iranian fencer. He competed in the individual and team sabre events at the 1976 Summer Olympics.

References

External links
 
 

1948 births
Living people
Iranian male sabre fencers
Olympic fencers of Iran
Fencers at the 1976 Summer Olympics
Asian Games gold medalists for Iran
Asian Games silver medalists for Iran
Asian Games medalists in fencing
Fencers at the 1974 Asian Games
Medalists at the 1974 Asian Games
20th-century Iranian people